Philip Major (born December 8, 1988) is a retired Canadian racing driver.

After karting and amateur racing, Major began professional racing in 2006 in Formula BMW USA. He returned in 2007 and finished 10th in points with a pole and a podium finish. He raced in the British Formula Three Championship in 2008 in the Championship Class for Fortec Motorsport. He completed the full season with 3 top-10 finishes and finished 18th in points, last among Championship Class participants that competed in the full schedule. He joined Carlin Motorsport at nearly the midpoint of the 2009 season and competed in 12 of the 20 races for the team and finished 17th in points.

For 2010, Major returned to North America to race in the Firestone Indy Lights Series for Sam Schmidt Motorsports. He finished 9th in points with a best finish of 3rd at Chicagoland Speedway. He also had the fastest lap at Iowa Speedway.

In 2018, Major started a new career path in the fintech industry, working at the leading Canadian online investment platform, FrontFundr, as a Due Diligence Analyst.

Indy Lights

References

External links
Majorspeed.com Major's official website

1988 births
Sportspeople from Ottawa
Racing drivers from Ontario
Formula BMW USA drivers
British Formula Three Championship drivers
Living people
Indy Lights drivers
Carlin racing drivers

Arrow McLaren SP drivers
Fortec Motorsport drivers